Rise or Die Trying is the second studio album from American rock band Four Year Strong. The name "Rise or Die Trying" comes from a lyric to "Go Long Dad", a song from their first album, It's Our Time.

Background and production
The group released their debut album It's Our Time in January 2005, and followed it up with another EP later that year.

The album was recorded and produced by Matt Robnett and Nik Tyler of Playwork Productions at Big Sky Audio in Springfield, Pennsylvania in March 2007.

Release
On July 14, 2007, Rise or Die Trying was announced for release in two months' time. Four Year Strong toured until August 2007, appeared on that year's Warped Tour and a package tour with From First to Last, Alesana and Vanna. Rise or Die Trying was released on September 18, 2007. In September and October, the group supported The Starting Line on their headlining US tour. In November and December, the band supported From First to Last on their headlining US tour. On December 1, a music video was released for "Heroes Get Remembered, Legends Never Die". From late January to early March 2008, the band supported Bayside on their tour of the US. The band supported the Starting Line on their headlining tour of the US in March and April, and appeared at the Give it a Name festival in the UK the following month. In July and August, the band performed on the 2008 edition of Warped Tour. In between dates on this tour, the band performed a handful of shows with other artists on Decaydance Records. On July 31, a music video was released for "Bada Bing! Wit' a Pipe!".

In September and October, the band went on a US tour with New Found Glory. Following this, the band went on a headlining West Coast and Midwest US tour with support from I Am the Avalanche, This Is Hell and A Loss for Words. In November, the band supported New Found Glory on their tour of the UK. "Bada Bing! Wit' a Pipe" was released as a single on November 23. In December, the band went on a brief holiday tour, titled Setting the Records Straight Tour alongside Set Your Goals, Every Avenue and Energy. Between mid-February and early April 2009, the band participated in the 2009 edition of Taste of Chaos. Following this, the band supported Bring Me the Horizon on their tour of Australia and New Zealand in May. In July, the band went on a tour of the US with Set Your Goals, Fireworks, the Swellers and Grave Maker. Further dates were added, extending the tour into late August.

Reception

It chart at number 31 on the Billboard Heatseekers album charts in 2007. The album has sold over 50,000 copies.

Track listing
All music written by Four Year Strong. All lyrics written by Alan Day and Dan O'Connor.

Bonus tracks

Personnel
Personnel per booklet.

Four Year Strong
Alan Day – vocals, guitar 
Dan O'Connor – vocals, guitar
Jake Massucco – drums
Joe Weiss – bass guitar, backing vocals
Josh Lyford – synth, unclean vocals

Additional musicians
 Mat Bruso – additional vocals on "Prepare to be Digitally Manipulated" and "Maniac (R.O.D.)"
 Four Year Strong – gang vocals
 Matt Robnett – gang vocals
 Brooks Plummer – gang vocals
 Nick Hanterelis – gang vocals

Production
 Matt Robnett – producer, engineer, mixing, mastering
 Nik Tyler – producer, engineer, mixing
 Rich King – assistant engineer, Pro Tools editing
 Alan Day – assistant engineer, Pro Tools editing
 Jake Caramanico – vocal tracking for Mat Bruso
 Greg Altman – guitar tones
 Brandon Ginsberg – drum tech
 Michael Bukowski – art, illustration
 Nick Arey – layout
 Kyle Holmquist – photography
 Dan O'Connor – logo, disc design

References

External links

Rise or Die Trying at YouTube (streamed copy where licensed)

2007 albums
Four Year Strong albums